While We Wait is the second commercial and third mixtape by American singer Kehlani. The album was released on February 22, 2019, by Atlantic Records. While We Wait features guest appearances from Musiq Soulchild, Dom Kennedy, Ty Dolla $ign, and 6lack.

Commercial performance
While We Wait opened at number nine on the US Billboard 200, earning 34,000 album-equivalent units, including 6,000 pure album sales in its first week. While We Wait is Kehlani's second US top 10 album.

Singles
Kehlani released the first single "Nights Like This" featuring American singer Ty Dolla Sign on January 10, 2019. The music video was released on the same day.

Track listing
Credits adapted from Tidal.

Sample credits
 "Footsteps" contains an interpolation of "Ice Box", as performed by Omarion.
 ”Morning Glory” samples “Impeach The President” by The Honeydrippers.

Charts

References

2019 mixtape albums
Kehlani albums